Trogneux is a French surname. It may refer to:

People with the surname
Alain Trogneux (born 1955), French local historian
Brigitte Trogneux, later known as Brigitte Macron, First Lady of France

Other
Fontaine Trogneux, later known as Fontaine de Charonne, historic fountain in Paris, France
Jean Trogneux, French chocolatier, run by five generations of the Trogneux family in Amiens